Got Purp? Vol. 2 is the second and final album released by the Purple Ribbon All-Stars presented by Big Boi. The first, titled Got That Purp is a mixtape released under The Aphilliates. "Kryptonite (I'm on It)" was released as the album's lead single. The song "Hold On" is the first Goodie Mob collaboration featuring all four original members since the group's World Party album and the Dungeon Family-collective Even in Darkness.

Track listing

Sample credits
"Dungeon Family Dedication" samples "Aquemini" and "Two Dope Boyz (In A Cadillac)" by Outkast. 
"Me, My Baby And My Cadillac" samples "Maybe Tomorrow" by The Jackson 5.
"Lovin' This" samples "Siempre Te Amaré" by Amanda Miguel.

Charts

Weekly charts

Year-end charts

See also
Got That Purp Vol.1

References

Big Boi albums
2005 albums
Virgin Records albums
Dungeon Family albums
Sequel albums